Cerylonidae are small to tiny, smooth, shiny, hairless beetles, only lightly punctured. There are about 450 species worldwide in 50 or so genera, mostly tropical and subtropical. They are most common under the bark of dead trees, but can also occur in compost and other decaying plant material. Little is known specifically about their biology but they are thought to be either predators that feed on other small animals, or fungus eating.

The taxonomy is complex. The "Cerylonid Series" is a cluster of highly derived former Cucujoidea families considered by recent authorities to comprise a separate superfamily Coccinelloidea. Several of these families (Alexiidae, Euxestidae, Murmidiidae) used to be included within Cerylonidae.

Selected Genera

 Afrorylon Slipinski, 1980 g
 As g
 Australiorylon Slipinski, 1988 g
 Axiocerylon Grouvelle, 1918 g
 Cautomus Sharp, 1885 g
 Cerylon Latreille, 1802 i c g b
 Cerylonopsis Handlirsch, 1906 g
 Ivieus Slipinski, 1991 g
 Loebliorylon Slipinski, 1990 i c g
 Lytopeplus Sharp, 1895 g
 Mychocerus Erichson, 1845 i c g b
 Ostomopsis Scott, 1922 i c g b
 Pathelus Dajoz, 1974 g
 Philothermopsis Heinze, 1944 g
 Philothermus Aubé, 1843 i c g b
 Ploeosoma Wollaston, 1854 g

Data sources: i = ITIS, c = Catalogue of Life, g = GBIF, b = Bugguide.net

Extinct genera 

 Protostomopsis Baltic amber, Eocene

References

External links

 Cerylonidae Tree of Life
 
 

 
Coccinelloidea
Polyphaga families